The Hutchins School is an Anglican, day and boarding school for boys from pre-kindergarten to Year 12 in Hobart, Tasmania. Established in 1846, Hutchins is one of the oldest continually operating schools in Australia. 
The school's students consistently rank among the highest academic achievers in Tasmania and nationally; it has had 24 Rhodes Scholars.
The school is located just under four kilometres from the CBD of Hobart, The Hutchins School offers facilities including classrooms, science and computer laboratories, libraries, a performing arts centre, a recording studio and multiple sporting grounds. 
International students reside in the school's boarding facility, ‘Burbury House’, which in 2012 underwent a full refit and refurbishment.
Hutchins is a founding-member of the International Boys' Schools Coalition (IBSC), and a member of Independent Schools Tasmania (IST).
The Hutchins School is one out of two boy's schools in Tasmania.

History
The Hutchins School was established in 1846 at Hobart Town in memory of The Venerable William Hutchins, first Archdeacon of Van Diemen's Land. Arriving in the colony in 1837, Archdeacon Hutchins had worked tirelessly to establish a faithful ministry, erecting churches and schools and laying the foundation for secondary education under the auspices of the Church of England.

The School commenced operations under Headmaster John Richard Buckland at Ingle Hall, a large Georgian house dating from 1811 which still stands in lower Macquarie Street, Hobart. Three years later it moved several blocks up Macquarie Street to a purpose-built schoolhouse designed by Tasmanian architect, William Archer.

In the early days of many and varied schools and tenuous longevity, Hutchins survived by absorbing pupils, staff and plant of other less robust institutions, including Christ's College (1846–1912), The High School (1850–65), Horton College (1855-93) and Officer College (1888–1900). When Hutchins joined forces with Christ's College in 1912 it was the signal for Arthur Augustus Stephens to close Queen's College, founded by him in 1893, and accept the post of Vice-Master of Hutchins. In 1905 Hutchins amalgamated with Buckland's School, opened in 1893 by William Harvey Buckland, son of founding headmaster J R Buckland and brother of second headmaster John Vansittart Buckland. Hutchins would go on to absorb King's Grammar School (1907), Franklin House School (1917) and Apsley House School (1928), and affiliate with Gryce (1934) and Gladwyn (1937) Schools.

By the 1950s the School was growing too large for its inner-city site and in 1957 a new Junior School was built on an elevated site overlooking the River Derwent at Sandy Bay. This followed the opening at the Sandy Bay site of a sub-primary section in 1946 and the Memorial Oval and pavilion in 1955. The Senior School was later constructed on the adjacent site of the former Queenborough Cemetery, following a council referendum in which ratepayers voted '1 for educational purposes' in 1960. By 1964 the Senior School campus encompassed a boarding house and science wing, quickly followed by an administration block and classrooms, while the Junior School campus across the road soon expanded to include a fledgling Middle School. The Macquarie Street building was sold in 1965, with Hutchins commencing full operations at Sandy Bay the following year.

Co-curricular program
The school runs an extensive co-curricular program offering music, performing arts, debating, sports and the Duke of Edinburgh International Award.

Sport 
The Hutchins School is a member of the Sports Association of Tasmanian Independent Schools (SATIS).

SATIS premierships 
The Hutchins School has won the following SATIS premierships.

 Athletics (23) - 1968, 1981, 1983, 1993, 1994, 1995, 1997, 1998, 1999, 2004, 2005, 2006, 2007, 2008, 2009, 2010, 2013, 2014, 2015, 2016, 2017, 2018, 2021
 Basketball - 2009
 Cricket (22) - 1926, 1938, 1962, 1967, 1969, 1973, 1975, 1980, 1981, 1984, 1986, 1987, 1994, 1997, 2002, 2003, 2004, 2005, 2007, 2010, 2018, 2021
 Cricket T20 (2) - 2018, 2021
Cross Country (38) - 1979, 1980, 1981, 1982, 1983, 1984, 1985, 1986, 1987, 1988, 1989, 1990, 1991, 1992, 1993, 1994, 1995, 1996, 1997, 1998, 1999, 2001, 2002, 2003, 2004, 2005, 2007, 2008, 2009, 2010, 2011, 2013, 2014, 2015, 2017, 2018, 2019, 2021
 Football (14) - 1968, 1969, 1983, 1986, 1987, 1988, 1989, 1994, 1997, 2000, 2004, 2006, 2009, 2010
 Hockey (17) - 1978, 1987, 1988, 1989, 1990, 1991, 1993, 1995, 1999, 2001, 2002, 2009, 2014, 2015, 2016, 2017, 2018
 Rowing (28) - 1979, 1980, 1981, 1982, 1983, 1984, 1985, 1986, 1987, 1988, 1989, 1990, 1991, 1992, 1993, 1994, 1995, 1997, 2007, 2010, 2011, 2012, 2013, 2014, 2015, 2017, 2018, 2021
 Rowing Eight (46) - 1923, 1924, 1926, 1928, 1934, 1937, 1957, 1964, 1965, 1966, 1967, 1969, 1970, 1971, 1972, 1980, 1981, 1982, 1983, 1984, 1985, 1986, 1989, 1990, 1991, 1992, 1993, 1995, 1998, 1999, 2000, 2003, 2004, 2005, 2006, 2008, 2009, 2010, 2011, 2012, 2014, 2015, 2016, 2017, 2019, 2021
 Soccer (7) - 1996, 1997, 1998, 2001, 2005, 2006, 2014
 Swimming (27) - 1976, 1977, 1978, 1984, 1985, 1986, 1987, 1988, 1990, 1991, 1992, 1993, 1994, 1995, 1997, 1998, 1999, 2000, 2001, 2002, 2003, 2005, 2006, 2008, 2010, 2015, 2018
 Tennis (10) - 1962, 1974, 1975, 1991, 1992, 1993, 1996, 2005, 2020, 2021

Headmasters

Notable alumni
Notable alumni of The Hutchins School include: 
 Errol Flynn, a Hollywood actor

 Percy Abbot , a soldier, politician and solicitor
 Stuart Barnes, poet (1981–1995)
 John Bisdee , first Australian winner of the Victoria Cross (1882-c1885)
 Frank Bowden , scientist
 Tim Bowden, broadcaster, journalist and author (1946–54)
 Sir Stanley Burbury , Governor of Tasmania (1973–1982)
 Bob Clifford, founder of Incat, shipbuilder and entrepreneur (1961)
 Sir John Davies , politician, newspaper proprietor and first-class cricketer
 Lyndhurst Giblin , economist
 Stephen Gumley, engineer and first CEO, Australian Defence Materiel Organisation (1966–74)
 Richard Hewson, master mariner and navigator, winner of 2011–12 Volvo Ocean Race (1992–97)
 Mitchell Hibberd, AFL Footballer
 Michael Hodgman, Liberal MHR (1947–56)
 Roger Hodgman, theatre and television director
 Will Hodgman, Liberal Premier (1980–86)
 Kevin Hofbauer, actor (2006)
 Paul Hudson, AFL footballer and coach (1988)
 Leonard Huxley , physicist and former President of the Australian Institute of Physics
 Thomas Murdoch , politician
 Brodie Neill, designer (1983–96)
 Harold Nicholas, Chief Justice of the Supreme Court, judge and politician
 Hamish Peacock, javelin olympian (2008)
 Sir James Ramsay , Governor of Queensland (1977–1985)
 John Stopp, President of the Legislative Council of Tasmania (1992–1995)
 Damon Thomas, Alderman and former Lord Mayor of Hobart, Tasmanian Crown Solicitor, State Ombudsman, CEO of the Tasmanian Chamber of Commerce and Industry and Korean Consul (1967)
 James William Tibbs , Headmaster of Auckland Grammar School, 1893–1922 (1867–72)
 Alan Walker, architect
 Owen Walsh, Administrator of Norfolk Island (2008–2012)
 Denis Warner , war correspondent, author and journalist (1928–35)
 Guy Wylly ,  joint first Australian winner of the Victoria Cross (1889-c1893)

Rhodes Scholars 
As of 2020, The Hutchins School has had 24 Rhodes Scholars, the latest being the 2021 Tasmania scholar, Nanak Narulla. Alumni have been awarded the Rhodes Scholarship for Australian states other than Tasmania, such as the 2016 New South Wales scholar, Harjeevan Narulla, Nanak's brother.

Notable Hutchins alumni to be awarded the Rhodes Scholarship include:

 1923 - Leonard Huxley

 1979 - Stephen Gumley

See also
 List of schools in Tasmania
 List of boarding schools
 Education in Tasmania
 International Boys' Schools Coalition

References

External links 
 The Hutchins School website

Educational institutions established in 1846
Anglican primary schools in Hobart
Anglican high schools in Hobart
Boarding schools in Tasmania
Boys' schools in Tasmania
Junior School Heads Association of Australia Member Schools
1846 establishments in Australia
Sandy Bay, Hobart